Varendra Museum is a museum, research centre, and popular visitor attraction at the heart of Rajshahi and maintained by Rajshahi University in Bangladesh. It is considered the oldest museum in Bangladesh. It was the first museum to be established in East Bengal in 1910. The museum started out as the collection for Varendra Anushandan Samiti (or Varendra Investigation Society) and got its current name in 1919. The Rajahs of Rajshahi and Natore, notably prince Sharat Kumar Ray, donated their personal collections to Varendra Museum. Varendra refers to an ancient Janapada roughly corresponding to modern northern Bangladesh.

History
Varendra (or Barind) was a region of Bengal, now in Bangladesh. It included the Pundravardhana or Pundra Kingdom region. According to Cunningham the boundary of Varendra was the Ganges and the Mahananda on the west, the Karatoya on the east, the Padma on the south, and the land between Koochbihar and the Terai on the north. The Varendra Brahmins originated from this region.

The settlement of Varendra, spoken as Janakabhu (fatherland), was one of the most flourishing territories of the ancient Indian sub-continent. Literary and epigraphic evidence show that a separate school of artisans earned wide reputation here at the reign of Pala dynasty and the streams of art making were uninterrupted until the Sena dynasty.

Some of the leading and enlightened citizens of Rajshahi felt the necessity and justification of establishing such an institution that would explore the precious past of this region. Hence, 'The Varendra Research Society' was established in 1910. The founder of the society, Kumar Sarat Kumar Ray, the scion of the Dighapatiya Royal family accompanied by Aksaya Kumar Maitreya, a leading lawyer and renowned historian; Ramaprasad Chanda, a reputed scholar in history, art and archaeology; and others explored archaeological and historical artefacts excavated in villages of Rajshahi.

The conviction grew in Kumar's mind if a centre of archaeological research was to be established at Rajshahi, the finds should be preserved there as the nucleus of a local museum. Accordingly, to collect, preserve, study and research the history and culture of ancient and medieval Bangal in general, and of Varendra region in particular, three worthy sons of the soil mentioned above took the effort to establish a museum.

The Varendra Research Society and Museum was set up at Rajshahi in 1910. The role of the society concerning the museum was that of proprietor and caretaker. However, this was formally inaugurated on 27 September 1910 and was registered in 1914 in accordance with the Indian Society Act, 1860.

Varendra Museum was the first museum to be established in erstwhile East Bengal in 1910. It started as the collection for Varendra Anushandhan Samiti or Varendra Investigation Society and got its current name in 1919. The Rajahs of Rajshahi and Natore (notably Prince Sharat Kumar Ray) donated their personal collections to Varendra Museum. Varendra refers to an ancient Janapada roughly corresponding to modern northern Bangladesh.

Excavation at Sompur Bihara was started by the society along with the University of Calcutta in 1923. In 1964, the museum became a part of Rajshahi University.

Collection
 Gallery One has collections from the Indus Valley civilization, and some of its 265 items from Sompur. It also contains old Sanskrit, Arabic and Persian scripts.
 Gallery Two has Buddhist and Hindu stone sculptures and modern wood sculptures.
 Galleries Three and Four display stone sculptures of Hindu gods and goddesses.
 Gallery Five offers mostly Buddhist sculpture.
 Gallery Six shows Arabic, Persian, Sanskrit and old Bengali stone inscriptions and sculptured stones of the Muslim period.
 A gallery has been added displaying the indigenous and tribal culture of Rajshahi region.

Site surroundings
In the existing site, three main structures were found. The front part is the Varendra Research Museum and the structural system is load-bearing brick wall. The linear rectangular building has two major functions: Administration and the Library. There is a Residential Block for officers and staff with a limited number of curators and the director. These structures have been constructed with brick. There is a garden in front of the director's residence with large old trees scattered among the entire site.

Services:
Gas, Water, Electricity is available with Internet, Postal, Cable and Phone Services.

Surrounding built form:
North: Hatem Kha boro mosque.
South: Chest disease hospital Jadhughor mor, Choto kutir, Boro kutir and Padma river
East:  Rajshahi Govt. Hospital, Shaheb bazar road and Rajshahi Railway Station
West: Residential zone, shops.

Museum Extension
Varenda Research Museum was built in 1910 with the support of Maharaja of Dighapatia. The museum has historical significance and is also a heritage site of Bangladesh. The century-old museum demands restoration and the existing gallery space is not adequate to preserve and display all the artefacts. Also the Archaeological sites were found recently and the artefacts are increasing day by day. The restoration program of existing museum has already begun. With the rise in number of artefacts in its inventory throughout the recent years and its added functional demand, the extension of this project has become inevitable to protect the old museum and to preserve the artefacts that has helped us learn more about our very own past.

Gallery

External links
 
  History of the Varendra Research Museum 

1910 establishments in India
Archaeological museums
Museums established in 1910
Museums in Bangladesh
Rajshahi
University museums
Research institutes in Bangladesh
Organisations based in Rajshahi